Le Coucher de la Mariée or Bedtime for the Bride or The Bridegroom's Dilemma is a French erotic short film considered to be one of the first erotic films made. The film was first screened in Paris in November 1896, within a year of the first public screening of a projected motion picture. The film was produced by Eugène Pirou and directed by Albert Kirchner under the pseudonym "Léar".

Plot 
A newlywed couple is in front of their wedding-bed after their wedding. The husband goes into raptures in front of his new wife, who simpers. She then asks him to withdraw while she undresses and he puts a folding screen between them. She removes one by one the many layers of clothes she wears  — a jacket, a dress, underskirts, sub-underskirts, a blouse. The husband does not stay in place, sometimes mopping his front, sometimes reading a newspaper, sometimes having lecherous looks above the folding screen. The actors send numerous glances towards the camera.

History of the movie
The original film has been estimated to be around seven minutes long, but it had degraded to a poor condition in the French Film Archives until it was found in 1996. Only two minutes of the film have survived, which includes the undressing sequence.

The film was shot in a theater set, and featured actress Louise Willy who performs the striptease. It is the direct adaptation of a theater show with the same name and the same cast. The show was very popular at the time, at Olympia Theater (Paris). It was a pantomime, quite risqué, but still not explicit as the actress was not nude. However, because only two minutes have survived from the original seven minutes, it is impossible to see more than the striptease.

See also
 El Satario
 List of incomplete or partially lost films

References

External links
 

1896 films
1890s pornographic films
French silent short films
French black-and-white films
Lost French films
French pornographic films
1896 short films
1890s lost films
1890s French films